Elisabetta Tona (born 22 January 1984) is an Italian former football defender who played for Florentia. She previously enjoyed a long association with Torres CF, where she won four Italian leagues, four nationals cups and two Italy Women's Cups in twelve seasons. She has also won the 2007 WPSL, playing for FC Indiana. As a member of the Italy national team she played at the 2005 and 2009 UEFA Women's Championships.

A commanding centre back, Tona's powerful heading ability makes her an important attacking player for her teams.

Club career
In summer 2003 Tona transferred from her first club ASD Fiammamonza to Torres Calcio Femminile.

International career
Tona made her senior debut for the Italy women's national football team in June 2002, in a 6–0 friendly win over Yugoslavia. She competed at UEFA Women's Euro 2005 in North West England and conceded a penalty kick in the Italians' 4–0 defeat to perennial champions Germany.

At UEFA Women's Euro 2009 in Finland, Tona played in all four games as the Italians reached the quarter-finals. She had scored a hat-trick against Hungary during the qualification round. National coach Antonio Cabrini named Tona in his selection for UEFA Women's Euro 2013 in Sweden, but replaced her with Federica Di Criscio when she was injured on the eve of the tournament.

Honours
Torres Calcio
 Serie A: 2010, 2011, 2012, 2013
 Italian Women's Cup: 2011
 Italian Women's Super Cup: 2009, 2010, 2011, 2012, 2013
 Italy Women's Cup: 2008

References

External links

1984 births
Living people
Italian women's footballers
Italy women's international footballers
Italian expatriate women's footballers
Sportspeople from Lecco
Serie A (women's football) players
Torres Calcio Femminile players
Women's association football central defenders
ASD Fiammamonza 1970 players
Florentia San Gimignano S.S.D. players
F.C. Indiana players
Expatriate women's soccer players in the United States
Italian expatriate sportspeople in the United States
Footballers from Lombardy